Jonas Engdahl is a Swedish ski-orienteering competitor. He competed at the  1990 World Ski Orienteering Championships in Skellefteå, where he placed 7th in the classic distance, and won a gold medal in the relay for Sweden, together with Bo Engdahl, Stig Mattsson and Anders Björkman.

References

Swedish orienteers
Male orienteers
Ski-orienteers
Year of birth missing (living people)
Living people
20th-century Swedish people